Legislative elections were held in Equatorial Guinea on 26 May 2013, alongside local elections. Following constitutional reforms approved in a 2011 referendum, they were the first elections in which the newly established Senate is elected. The ruling Democratic Party of Equatorial Guinea won all but one seat in both houses of Parliament.

Electoral system
The Senate has 70 members, of which 55 were elected and 15 were to be appointed by President Teodoro Obiang Nguema Mbasogo.

The 100 members of the Chamber of People's Representatives were elected by closed list proportional representation in multi-member constituencies.

Results

Senate

Chamber of People's Representatives

References

Legislative elections in Equatorial Guinea
Equatorial Guinea
2013 in Equatorial Guinea
Election and referendum articles with incomplete results